The Guinean Press Agency (AGP) is a press agency in Guinea. It was run by the government under Sékou Touré and provided daily news updates to the other government officials and international diplomatic corps.
A revitalized press emerged during the coup of April 1984. The agency is still active as of November 2015.

References

External links
Agence Guinéenne de Presse 

Government of Guinea
Mass media in Guinea
Organisations based in Guinea